Blair Cunningham (born October 11, 1957, Memphis, Tennessee) is an American drummer who has played for many bands and artists including Denise LaSalle, Robert Johnson, the Detroit Emeralds, Frederick Knight, Echo & the Bunnymen, Haircut One Hundred, John Foxx, the Pretenders, Paul McCartney, Alison Moyet, Sade, Paul Rutherford, Indigo Girls, Roxy Music, Tina Turner, Lionel Richie, Mick Jagger, Ray Davis, Andy Taylor, Marius Müller-Westernhagen, Kevin Rowland and the Big Dish. He played drums at a one-off gig by Sharks, and on "All Things Are Nice" and "My Baby" from Blancmange's album Mange Tout.

Blair is the son of Kelly Cunningham Sr. and Ernestine Cunningham. Blair is the youngest of 13 children, 10 boys and 3 girls. His oldest brother Kelly Cunningham Jr. taught all of the brothers to play drums and was his biggest influence.  His brother Carl Cunningham was drummer with Stax group the Bar-Kays. Carl died in the same plane crash that killed Otis Redding in December 1967. When Blair was 10 years old.

References

External links
 Brief Autobiography

1957 births
Living people
Musicians from Memphis, Tennessee
African-American drummers
African-American rock musicians
20th-century American drummers
American male drummers
Indigo Girls members
The Pretenders members
Haircut One Hundred members
American emigrants to England
Black British rock musicians
Paul McCartney Band members
New wave drummers